The First Christian Church is a historic church at 103 South Boston Avenue in downtown Russellville, Arkansas.  It is a single-story building with a cruciform plan and a Gothic Revival brick exterior.  It was built in 1885–86 with a wooden exterior and smaller plan; the brick siding was added during a major remodeling and expansion in 1925.  It was built for a congregation affiliated with the Disciples of Christ, which was founded in 1882.  It was judged one of the most expensive wooden churches in the state when it was built.

The building was listed on the National Register of Historic Places in 2006.

See also
National Register of Historic Places listings in Pope County, Arkansas

References

Churches on the National Register of Historic Places in Arkansas
Gothic Revival church buildings in Arkansas
Churches completed in 1885
Buildings and structures in Russellville, Arkansas
National Register of Historic Places in Pope County, Arkansas
1885 establishments in Arkansas
Christian Church (Disciples of Christ) congregations